Brookfield is a surname. Notable people with the surname include:

 Arthur Brookfield (1870–1930), English footballer
 Arthur Montagu Brookfield (1853–1940), British army officer etc.
 Charles Brookfield (1857–1913), British actor, playwright etc.
 Edward Brookfield (1880–1965), British fencer
 Gaz Brookfield (born 1979), English folk and rock musician
 Harold Brookfield (1926–2022), British and Australian geographer
 Jane Octavia Brookfield (1821–1896), English literary hostess and writer
 John Brookfield (born 1955), British population geneticist
 Percy Brookfield (1875–1921), Australian politician and trade unionist
 Price Brookfield (1920–2006), American basketball and baseball player
 Ryan Brookfield (born 1987), English footballer
 Stephen Brookfield (born 1949), English-born scholar in adult education
 William Brookfield (politician) (1844–1903), American businessman and politician
 William Henry Brookfield (1809–1874), English priest etc.

See also
 Brookfield (disambiguation)